Boogaard is a Dutch surname. Notable people with the surname include:

 Aaron Boogaard (born 1986), professional Canadian ice hockey player
 Derek Boogaard (1982–2011), professional Canadian ice hockey player of the NHL
 Krysten Boogaard (born 1988), professional Canadian basketball forward
 Nigel Boogaard (born 1986), Australian soccer player

See also
Van den Boogaard
Bogaard

Dutch-language surnames